Ammotheidae is the most diversified group of the class Pycnogonida, with 297 species described in more than 20 genera, of which only Nymphopsis and Sericosura were found to be monophyletic. Despite its internal taxonomic uncertainty, studies on 18S rRNA supports its monophyly, and the subdivision on Achelinae and Ammotheinae subfamilies.

Genera 
The family Ammotheidae comprises the following subfamilies:

  Achelia Hodge, 1864
  Acheliana Arnaud, 1971
  Ammothea Leach, 1814
  Ammothella Verrill, 1900
  Austroraptus Hodgson, 1907
  Biammothea Pushkin, 1993
  Cilunculus Loman, 1908
  Dromedopycnon Child, 1982
  Elassorhis Child, 1982
  Hedgpethius Child, 1974
  Hemichela Stock, 1954
  Megarhethus Child, 1982
  Nymphopsis Haswell, 1885
  Oorhynchus Hoek, 1881
  Paranymphon Caullery, 1896
  Proboehmia Stock, 1991
  Prototrygaeus Stock, 1975
  Scipiolus Loman, 1908
  Sericosura Fry & Hedgpeth, 1969
  Tanystylum Miers, 1879
Teratonotum Sabroux, Corbari, Krapp, Bonillo, Le Prieur & Hassanin, 2017 
  Trygaeus Dohrn, 1881
  Pariboea Philippi, 1843
Pasithoe Goodsir, 1842

Diversity gallery

References

External links 

 World Register od Marine Especies (Worms): Ammotheidae Dohrn, 1881 AphiaID: 1562
 Integrated Taxonomic Information System (ITIS): Ammotheidae  Taxonomic Serial No.: 83572
 National Center for Biotechnololy Information (NCBI): Ammotheidae Taxonomy ID: 61893

Pycnogonids
Chelicerate families